Absent in the Spring is a novel written by Agatha Christie and first published in the UK by Collins in August 1944 and in the US by Farrar & Rinehart later in the same year. It was the third of six novels Christie wrote under the pen name Mary Westmacott.

Explanation of the novel's title
The title is a quotation from William Shakespeare's sonnet 98: "From you have I been absent in the spring,..."

Plot introduction
Stranded between trains, Joan Scudamore finds herself reflecting upon her life, her family, and finally coming to grips with the uncomfortable truths about her life.

Literary significance and reception
The Times Literary Supplement'''s review of 19 August 1944 by Marjorie Grant Cook stated positively, "The writer has succeeded in making this novel told in retrospect, with its many technical difficulties, very readable indeed. She has not made Joan, with her shallow, scrappy mind, sympathetic, and the other characters in the tale, seen through her eyes, lack the charm they had for each other and withheld from her."

J. D. Beresford's review in The Guardian of 25 August 1944 concluded, "It is a very clever and consistently interesting study of a character that not even a desert vision could permanently change."

Publication history
 1944, William Collins & Sons (London), August 1944, Hardcover, 160 pp
 1944, Farrar & Rinehart (New York), 1944, Hardcover, 250 pp
 1967, Dell Books, Paperback, 192 pp
 1971, Arbor House, Hardback, 250 pp
 1974, Fontana Books (Imprint of HarperCollins), Paperback, 192 pp
 1978, Ulverscroft Large-print Edition, Hardcover, 300 pp; 

The novel was first serialised in the US in Good Housekeeping'' in two abridged instalments from July to August 1944.

References

External links
Absent in the Spring at the official Agatha Christie website

1944 British novels
Novels by Agatha Christie
Novels first published in serial form
Works originally published in Good Housekeeping
Works published under a pseudonym
William Collins, Sons books